Leila Kalanzi Kachapizo (born 5 December 1979), is a Ugandan comedian, actor, hairstylist, radio and television personality. She is best known for several radio and television programs in Ugandan media.

Personal life
Kalanzi was born on 5 December 1979 in a pharmacy in Nakivubo Mews, Masaka district, in the central Uganda. She was born to Hajjat Hamida Nalwoga. She has four siblings; three sisters and a brother, who is dead. She grew up with her mother and siblings, where her father had separated from the family when she was a toddler. Her mother got an accident and had multiple injuries, where she spent three months in hospital. Her father Hajj Abdul Kalanzi died on 23 October 2018 with an unknown cause. His remains were laid to rest at Nkoowe village, Wakiso district on 24 October 2018.

Career
She completed her primary education from St. Anne's Preparatory in Kabowa. Then Kalanzi joined Pride Academy and Nakivubo Settlement to study up to senior four. However she dropped out of school started her drama and acting career. With that intension, she joined with the Bakayimbira drama actors. Within the Bakayimbira, she met Charles Senkubuge, who polished her acting credentials.

Meanwhile, she got the opportunity to travel to Netherlands alongside John Segawa and Bakayimbira group members for some theatre works. But she returned to Uganda in the mid of the tour. After the return, she got a job at Radio Simba in Bukoto as a presenter. After few months of working, she moved to another radio station called CBS radio in the central region of Uganda and worked for six months. However, she decided to travel back to Netherlands to have a longer career. During this period in Europe, she did some odd jobs and also started hairstyling. Unfortunately she was arrested and detained for overstaying in Netherlands and deported back to Uganda.

After returning to Uganda, she got the opportunity to work at Bukedde FM. In May 2019, she got another job on Sanyuka television, but later quit due to some disputes with administration.

Television series

References

Living people
Ugandan people
1979 births
Ugandan television presenters
Ugandan radio presenters
Ugandan women television presenters
Ugandan women radio presenters
Ugandan comedians
Ugandan women comedians